Qazanbatan (known as Otradnoye until 1992) is a village and municipality in the Saatly Rayon of Azerbaijan.  It has a population of 1,011.

References 

Populated places in Saatly District